Law & Order: Organized Crime is an American crime drama television series that premiered on April 1, 2021, on NBC. The seventh series in the Law & Order franchise and a spin-off of Law & Order and  Law & Order: Special Victims Unit, the series stars Christopher Meloni as Elliot Stabler, reprising his role from SVU. The show features a "single-arc" storyline that takes multiple episodes to resolve.

The first season premiered on April 1, 2021, and was renewed for a second season comprising 24 episodes but only 22 episodes were produced. The second season premiered on September 23, 2021, and the series was renewed in May 2022 for a third season, which premiered on September 22, 2022.

Premise

The series centers on Law & Order: Special Victims Unit character Elliot Stabler, a veteran Detective who returns to the NYPD in New York following his wife's murder. Stabler joins the Organized Crime Task Force, led by Sergeant Ayanna Bell.

Cast and characters

Main
 Christopher Meloni as Detective 1st Grade Elliot Stabler, a former Manhattan Special Victims Unit detective who returns to New York after retiring from the police department several years earlier. He joins a task force within the Organized Crime Control Bureau to find his wife's killers and becomes its second-in-command.
 Danielle Moné Truitt as Sergeant Ayanna Bell, squad supervisor of the OCCB task force and Stabler's current direct superior and partner.
 Tamara Taylor as Prof. Angela Wheatley (seasons 1–2), a former math professor at Columbia University, ex-wife of Richard Wheatley, and a suspect in the hit ordered on Kathy Stabler. She committed suicide and presumably murdered Richard at the same time after discovering that Richard was responsible for her son Richie's murder. 
 Ainsley Seiger as Detective 3rd Grade Jet Slootmaekers, a former independent hacker who is recruited to the OCCB task force on Stabler's recommendation. She was requalified as an NYPD officer to work with the OCCB task force.
 Dylan McDermott as Richard Wheatley (seasons 1–2), son of notorious mobster Manfredi Sinatra, now a businessman and owner of an online pharmaceutical company who leads a second life as a crime boss, and was a suspect in the murder of Stabler's wife. He was presumed murdered by Angela after she discovered that Wheatley murdered their son Richie. 
 Nona Parker Johnson as Detective 3rd Grade Carmen "Nova" Riley (season 2), an undercover narcotics detective working under Brewster's command to infiltrate the Marcy Killers. 
 Brent Antonello as Detective Jamie Whelan (season 3), a detective with the Organized Crime Control Bureau.
 Rick Gonzalez as Detective Bobby Reyes (season 3), an undercover detective with the Organized Crime Control Bureau.

Recurring
 Ben Chase as Detective 1st Grade Freddie Washburn (season 1), a detective from the Narcotics unit recruited to the OCCB task force, and Bell's former senior partner in Narcotics. He presumably leaves the OCCB after making a critical mistake that allows Richard Wheatley to try and kill Angela.
 Michael Rivera as Detective 2nd Grade Diego Morales (season 1), a detective originally from the Gun Violence Suppression Division recruited to the OCCB task force. He is eventually uncovered as the mole for Richard Wheatley, and is killed by Bell in the season 1 finale during a last attempt to assassinate Angela.
 Shauna Harley as Pilar Wheatley (season 1; guest season 2), Richard's current wife.
 Nick Creegan as Richard "Richie" Wheatley Jr. (season 1; guest season 2), Richard and Prof. Angela Wheatley's older son, who aspires to follow in the family business. He is eventually arrested alongside his father in a bust, and later puts a hit out on him in the season 1 finale after learning that he was responsible for the murder of his grandfather, Manfredi Sinatra. Richie testifies on behalf of the prosecution in his father's trial for Kathy Stabler's murder, but later recants on the stand. Richard later has him released from prison, only to then kill him for his betrayal.
 Jaylin Fletcher as Ryan Wheatley (season 1), Richard's and Pilar's son.
 Christina Marie Karis as Dana Wheatley (season 1; guest season 2), Richard and Prof. Angela Wheatley's only daughter who assists her father in his crimes, including the robbery of several COVID-19 vaccines.
 Ibrahim Renno as Izak Bekher (season 1), Richard's right-hand man who begins working for the NYPD to trap Wheatley. He is later killed at  Richard Sr.'s command because he was the sole witness to Richard Jr.'s involvement in Gina's murder.
 Charlotte Sullivan as Detective 3rd Grade Gina Cappelletti (season 1), an undercover detective assigned to the OCCB task force who has infiltrated a club run by the mafia to keep an eye on Richard. However, Gina is eventually caught by the Wheatleys and is subsequently murdered by Richie.
 Nicky Torchia as Elliot "Eli" Stabler Jr. (recurring season 1–2), Stabler's youngest son.
 Autumn Mirassou as Maureen "Mo" Stabler (recurring season 1–2), Stabler's eldest child.
 Kaitlyn Davidson as Elizabeth "Lizzie" Stabler (recurring season 1–2), Stabler's youngest daughter and Dickie's twin sister.
 Keren Dukes as Denise Bullock (recurring season 1–3), the wife of Ayanna Bell, who filed a lawsuit against the NYPD after her nephew was brutally beaten by police. She worked as a public defender at Congressman Kilbride's old firm until Ayanna and the OCCB arrested Kilbride.
 Diany Rodriguez as ADA Maria Delgado (season 1), an ADA who formerly worked with the task force.
 Wendy Moniz as ADA Anne Frasier (recurring season 1–2), the prosecutor on the Wheatley and K-O case.
 Daniel Oreskes as Lieutenant Marv Moennig (recurring season 1–2), the commanding officer of the OCCB task force. He steps down from the OCCB during season 2 and is succeeded by Bill Brewster as CO.
 Nicholas Baroudi as Joey Raven (season 1), the owner of the Seven Knights club.
 Steve Harris as Ellsworth Lee (season 1), Angela Wheatley's attorney.
 Mike Cannon as Detective 3rd Grade Carlos Maldonado (season 2), a detective formerly under Brewster's command, but who now works under Bell's.
 Rachel Lin as Detective 1st Grade Victoria Cho (season 2), a detective formerly under Brewster's command, but who now works under Bell's.
 Lolita Davidovich as Flutura Briscu (season 2), the wife of Albanian mobster and gang leader, Albi Briscu. She was also a madam who trafficked Albanian women to America and forced them into the sex trade.
 Antino Crowley-Kamenwati as Hugo Bankole (guest season 1; recurring season 2), a VP in the Marcy Killers organization.
 Izabela Vidovic as Rita Lasku (season 2), a waitress who was trafficked by the Kosta Organization.
 Caroline Lagerfelt as Agniezjka "Agnes" Bogdani (season 2), Reggie Bogdani's mother and Albi Briscu's sister.
 Robin Lord Taylor as Sebastian "Constantine" McClane (season 2), a notorious hacker and high-security convict who escaped prison.
 Gregg Henry as Edmund Ross (season 2), a businessman who was involved in a sex trafficking ring with the Kosta Organization.
 Wesam Keesh as Adam "Malachi" Mintock (season 2), a hacker who created an app for the Kosta Organization, now forced to assist the Organized Crime Task Force in order to avoid prosecution. He is currently involved with Jet Slootmaekers.
 James Cromwell as Miles Darman (season 2), a neighbor of Stabler who was hired by Wheatley to charm Bernadette.
 Liris Crosse as Officer Tanisha Carling (season 2), a member of the Brotherhood.
 Eddie Yu as Officer David Yoshida (season 2), a member of the Brotherhood.
 Justin Grace as Ron Bolton (season 2), a member of the Brotherhood.
 Sebastian Arroyo as Officer Jessie Santos (season 2), a member of the Brotherhood. 
 Patrick Murney as Officer Scott Parnell, a member of the Brotherhood. 
 Tim Ransom as Officer Stanwood (season 2), a member of the Brotherhood.
 Wass Stevens as Dominic Russo (season 3), an enforcer associated with Vincent Bishop and Teddy Silas. He was also a suspect in Henry Cole's murder. He was later shot and killed by Stabler before he could be arrested.
 Kevin Corrigan as Vincent Bishop (season 3), a former construction foreman associated with Teddy Silas. He was also a suspect in the murder of Henry Cole. He later committed suicide before he could be arrested.
 Michael Drayer as Kenny Kyle (season 3), a career criminal and a suspect in the murder of Henry Cole.
 Janel Moloney as Deputy Inspector Lillian Goldfarb (season 3)
 Christopher Cassarino as Vaughn Davis (season 3), a gang leader who recruited fake cops to rob and assault civilians. He is also the foster brother of Bobby Reyes, Manny Rivera and Dante Scott.
 Pooch Hall as Dante Scott (season 3), a recently released drug dealer who joins a criminal gang run by Vaughn Davis. He is also the foster brother of Vaughn Davis, Bobby Reyes and Manny Rivera.
 Daniel Jenkins as Leonard Baker (season 3), the former foster father of Bobby Reyes, Vaughn Davis, Dante Scott and Manny Rivera.
 Ayelet Zurer as Agent Tia Leonetti (season 3), an agent with Italian police who has a history with Stabler.
 Kevin Craig West as Terrence Bryant (season 1), the Brooklyn Borough President

Special guest stars
 Dash Mihok as Reggie Bogdani (season 2), Albi Briscu's nephew who serves as Stabler's boss during his time undercover infiltrating the Kosta organization.
 Vinnie Jones as Albi Briscu (season 2), an Eastern European gangster who is the last remaining member of his organization from the old country. He serves as Jon Kosta's underboss.
 Michael Raymond-James as Jon Kosta (season 2), the founder and leader of the Kosta Organization.
 Guillermo Díaz as Sergeant/Lieutenant William "Bill" Brewster (season 2), the sergeant of a Narcotics task force and was previously Ayanna Bell's boss before she was transferred to the Organized Crime Control Bureau. He is promoted to lieutenant and takes over as commanding officer following Lieutenant Moennig's departure.
 Ellen Burstyn as Bernadette "Bernie" Stabler (season 2), Elliot's mother who is in the early stages of dementia.
 Mykelti Williamson as Preston Webb (season 2), a construction magnate who is actually a dangerous crime kingpin in charge of the Marcy Killers organization; he is affiliated with Congressman Kilbride. He is killed in the season 2 finale.
 Denis Leary as Frank Donnelly (season 2), a longtime member of the NYPD who has a history with Stabler. Donnelly is revealed to be the leader of The Brotherhood, a crime syndicate of dirty cops within the NYPD. After the Brotherhood is uncovered and arrested at the end of the second season, Donnelly commits suicide to avoid disgrace and prison.
 Jennifer Beals as Cassandra Webb (season 2), the wife of Preston Webb.
 Ron Cephas Jones as Congressman Leon Kilbride (season 2), a politician who fosters connections and seems to have one with the Wheatleys. He is also the mentor of Preston Webb, and is affiliated with Marcy Killers.
 Camilla Belle as Pearl Serrano (season 3), the wife of Teddy Silas.
 Gus Halper as Teddy Silas (season 3), a construction foreman who gets involved in a murder investigation run by the OCCB task force. He is the husband of Pearl Serrano and the son of Robert Silas. He later helps OCCB to try to take down the New Westies organization, but he leaves in the middle of their investigation, and he gets arrested once again.

Crossover stars from Law & Order: Special Victims Unit
 Mariska Hargitay as Captain Olivia Benson (recurring seasons 1–2; guest season 3)
 Peter Scanavino as Assistant District Attorney Dominick Carisi Jr. (guest season 1)
 Demore Barnes as Deputy Chief Christian Garland (guest season 1)
 Ice-T as Sergeant Fin Tutuola (guest season 2)
 Raúl Esparza as Defense Attorney (Former ADA) Rafael Barba (guest season 2)
 Dann Florek as Former Captain Donald Cragen (recurring season 2)
 Octavio Pisano as Detective Joe Velasco (guest seasons 2–3)
 Kelli Giddish as Detective Amanda Rollins (recurring season 3)

Crossover stars from Law & Order
 Jeffrey Donovan as Detective Frank Cosgrove (guest season 3)
 Mehcad Brooks as Detective Jalen Shaw (guest season 3)
 Camryn Manheim as Lieutenant Kate Dixon (guest season 3)

Episodes

Production

Development

On March 31, 2020, NBC had given a 13-episode order to a new crime drama starring Meloni as his character from Law & Order: Special Victims Unit, Elliot Stabler. Dick Wolf, Arthur W. Forney, and Peter Jankowski, serve as the executive producers, with Matt Olmstead being looked at as showrunner and writer. The series came following Wolf's five-year deal with Universal Television, which will serve as the series' production company along with Wolf Entertainment.

The series was originally planned to be set up in the twenty-first season finale of Law & Order: Special Victims Unit, with Stabler's wife and son returning. The episode would also have revealed the whereabouts of the Stabler family following Meloni's departure as the character in season twelve. When asked whether or not the storyline would instead happen in the twenty-second season premiere, Law & Order: Special Victims Unit showrunner Warren Leight said that "it's pretty clear that Elliot will be in the SVU season opener". Craig Gore was set to be a writer for the series, but was fired by Wolf on June 2, 2020, for controversial Facebook posts about looters and the curfew put in place in Los Angeles due to protests about the murder of George Floyd. Gore had listed himself as co-executive producer on the series on his Facebook profile, but Meloni announced Olmstead would be the showrunner for the series, not Gore. The same day, the series title was revealed to be Law & Order: Organized Crime. The first teaser for the series was released during the 30 Rock: A One-Time Special on July 17. In July, Meloni stated he had not yet seen a script, and the writers were still working on the story. By October, Olmstead had stepped down as showrunner, and he was later replaced by Ilene Chaiken in December. In February 2022, Chaiken was replaced as showrunner by Hannah Montana co-creator Barry O'Brien. On May 14, 2021, NBC renewed the series for a second season, which premiered on September 23, 2021. On May 10, 2022, NBC renewed the series for a third season, which is set to premiere on September 22, 2022.

Casting
During the production of the series, in July 2020, Meloni announced Mariska Hargitay would make a guest appearance as her character from Law & Order: Special Victims Unit, Olivia Benson. On January 27, 2021, Dylan McDermott had been cast in the series, with Tamara Taylor, Danielle Moné Truitt, Ainsley Seiger, Jaylin Fletcher, Charlotte Sullivan, Nick Creegan, and Ben Chase joining the following month. At the end of March, it was reported that Nicky Torchia, Michael Rivera, and Ibrahim Renno would appear in recurring roles. In March, it was revealed that some of the actors who played members of the Stabler family as far back as 1999, in episodes of Law & Order: Special Victims Unit, would appear in the new series, including Allison Siko as daughter Kathleen and Jeffrey Scaperrotta as son Dickie, while Isabel Gillies appeared as soon to be murdered wife Kathy in the Law & Order: Special Victims Unit episode that sees the Stablers return to New York, setting the scene for the new series. In August, Ron Cephas Jones, Vinnie Jones, Lolita Davidovich, Mykelti Williamson, Guillermo Díaz and Dash Mihok joined the cast in recurring roles for the second season. In early 2022, Jennifer Beals and Denis Leary joined the cast in recurring roles. In July 2022, Rick Gonzalez and Brent Antonello joined the cast for the third season. In August 2022, Camilla Belle and Gus Halper joined the cast for the third season.

Filming
Like Law & Order: Special Victims Unit, the series is filmed on location in New York. Production was set to begin on the series in August 2020, but was announced in September that the series was the only one produced by Wolf Entertainment to not be given a start date for production. The series later began production on January 27, 2021, during the COVID-19 pandemic, with Meloni and Hargitay sharing pictures on set. In the following months, the production on the series had been halted twice due to two positive COVID-19 tests; despite the halt, it was announced the series would still premiere on the same date.

On July 19, 2022, Johnny Pizarro, a crew member working on the show, was fatally shot while filming was underway for the third season.

Release

Broadcast
On June 16, 2020, it was announced the series would air on Thursdays on NBC at 10 p.m. Eastern Time, the former timeslot of Law & Order: Special Victims Unit, with the latter moving up an hour to 9 p.m. The series was the only new series on NBC's fall lineup at the moment for the 2020–21 television season. In August 2020, the series was pushed back to 2021 and on February 4, 2021, it was announced the series would premiere on April 1, 2021, as part of a two-hour crossover with Law & Order: Special Victims Unit. The first season consists of eight episodes.

Streaming
The series is available on the streaming service, Peacock, with episodes being released on the service a week after they air on NBC for the service's free tier, and the next day for the paid tier.

International
In Canada, Organized Crime airs on Citytv in simulcast with NBC, unlike past U.S.-set Law & Order series which have all aired on CTV. Because of commitments to other Thursday night programming like Grey's Anatomy, CTV aired the direct lead-in episode of SVU out of simulcast in the 10:00 p.m. ET/PT timeslot, airing directly against the premiere of its spin-off on Citytv. In Australia, Organized Crime airs on the Nine Network on Monday night timeslot starting April 12, 2021.

Home media
The first two seasons have been released on DVD for Region 4, with all yet to be released for Region 1.

Ratings

Notes

References

External links
  on Wolf Entertainment
  on NBC
 

2021 American television series debuts
2020s American crime drama television series
2020s American police procedural television series
American television spin-offs
Fictional portrayals of the New York City Police Department
Law & Order: Organized Crime
Law & Order: Special Victims Unit
NBC original programming
Television productions suspended due to the COVID-19 pandemic
Television series about organized crime
Television series about widowhood
Television series created by Dick Wolf
Television series by Universal Television
Television shows filmed in New York City
Television shows set in Manhattan
Works about the American Mafia